The 1985 Currie Cup was the 47th edition of the Currie Cup, the premier annual domestic rugby union competition in South Africa.

See also

 Currie Cup

References

1985
1985 in South African rugby union
1985 rugby union tournaments for clubs